The cadet rank at the United States Air Force Academy is determined by two factors: class year and job. First year, or fourth-class, cadets (C4C) have only one rank; but as they progress through the Academy, their roles, responsibilities, and ranks increase, culminating in their senior year, where roles as an Assistant Shop Lead garner the rank of cadet first lieutenant (C/1Lt), while roles such as the Cadet Wing Commander (AFCW/CC), Cadet Vice Wing Commander (AFCW/CV), or Cadet Wing Director of Operations (AFCW/DO) are accorded the highest rank of cadet colonel.

Cadet Rank Insignia

Former cadet ranks

Cadet Squadron Insignia

Current Cadet Squadrons

Defunct Cadet Squadron Insignia

Miscellaneous Insignia

Merit lists
Cadet merit list insignia are worn by those cadets who excel militarily (Commandant's List), academically (Dean's List), or athletically (Athletic Director's List).  Cadets who earn a place on all three lists are awarded the insignia for the Superintendent's List.

Aviation
Cadet aviation insignia are worn by cadets who achieve certain milestones in their flight training.

Other qualifications
While at the Air Force Academy, cadets may earn other insignia including: parachute wings, for completion of either freefall parachute training at the Academy or the U.S. Army's Airborne School at Fort Benning, Georgia; the Air Assault Badge for completion of the U.S. Army's Air Assault program at Fort Campbell, Kentucky; or the Bulldog badge for the completion of the U.S. Marine Corps' "Bulldog" program at Marine Corps Base Quantico in Virginia.

See also 
Cadet Wing Commander (AFCW/CC)
Cadet Wing Director of Operations (AFCW/DO)
United States Air Force Academy Cadet Wing
United States Air Force Academy

Notes

References
Squadron Insignia of the United States Air Force Academy, P. Michael Sheridan, 1990.

Contrails, various years.
U.S. Air Force Academy, The Core of Cadet Life: Squadrons, https://www.usafa.edu/military/squadrons/ Retrieved 2021-09-08.

Cadet Insignia
Cadet Insigna